The Ramena River is a river of northwestern Madagascar in the region of Diana. It has its sources at the Maromokotra  and is the main affluent of the Sambirano River.

References

Rivers of Diana Region
Rivers of Madagascar